Shreve, Lamb, and Harmon, founded as Shreve & Lamb, was an architectural firm, best known for designing the Empire State Building, the tallest building in the world at the time of its completion in 1931.

History
The firm was founded in 1920 as Shreve & Lamb, a partnership of Richmond Harold ("R.H.") Shreve, a Canadian from Nova Scotia, and William F. Lamb, from Brooklyn, New York, U.S.—Shreve was the administrator, while Lamb was the designer. The two met while working at Carrère & Hastings, and Shreve & Lamb was initially a Carrère & Hastings firm. In 1924 the pair decided to leave Carrère & Hastings and became an autonomous architectural company.

In 1929, Arthur Loomis Harmon, from Chicago, Illinois, U.S., joined Shreve & Lamb, and the firm became Shreve, Lamb & Harmon. Prior to joining the firm, Harmon's works included battle monuments at Tours, Cantigny and Somme-Py in France, a YMCA in Jerusalem, and the Shelton Hotel in New York, U.S.

For the construction of the Empire State Building, the firm's most notable work, Lamb was responsible for the design, while Shreve's planning skills facilitated the completion of the construction in a year. Shreve's planning skills were recognized in New York and he was involved in projects beyond the firm, such as the Slum clearance Committee of New York.

Shreve, Lamb & Harmon primary focus was commercial office buildings and their work in this area was described as "spare and functional" in 2010 by the Landmarks Preservation Commission. However, the firm completed numerous residential projects, such as No. 130 East 57th Street, and this facet of the company's work was mainly conducted in neo-Tudor, as well as other popular historical styles of the 1920s.

Shreve, Lamb and Harmon had also employed the future architect behind the original World Trade Center complex, Minoru Yamasaki after he had completed a masters degree in architecture in 1936. Lasting until 1945, this professional relationship was cut short when Yamasaki took a job at Smith, Hinchman &Grylls.

It is not entirely clear when the company went out of business, with 1989 being a likely date.

Notable buildings

All buildings are located in New York City unless otherwise indicated:

Reynolds Building, Winston-Salem, 1929
521 Fifth Avenue (also known as the Lefcourt National Building), 1929
740 Park Avenue (with Rosario Candela), 1930 
3 East 57th Street, 1930
500 Fifth Avenue, 1931
Empire State Building, 1930–1931
14 Wall Street (formerly the Bankers Trust Company Building) addition, 1931–1932
Joel W. Solomon Federal Building and United States Courthouse (with R. H. Hunt), Chattanooga, Tennessee, 1932
99 John Deco Lofts (formerly The Great American Insurance Company Building), 1933
Jerusalem International YMCA (architect Arthur Loomis Harmon), Jerusalem, Israel, 1933
Acacia Building, Washington, D.C., 1936
Hill Building (formerly the SunTrust Tower, CCB Building or Central Carolina Bank, and Durham Bank and Trust Building), Durham, North Carolina, 1935–1937
100 Ardsley Avenue West (Hudson House), Irvington, NY 1936
Lever Brothers Co. Headquarters (now MIT Sloan School, Building E52), Cambridge, Massachusetts, 1938
Hunter College, 1940
Parkchester buildings, 1939–1942
Best & Company Building (demolished), 1947
1740 Broadway (formerly the MONY Building or Mutual of New York Building), 1950
New York Supreme Court, Kings County, 1957
Carman Hall, 1960
United Engineering Center (demolished in 1997), 1961
280 Park Avenue (formerly the Bankers Trust Building, with Emery Roth & Sons), 1961
222 Broadway (formerly the Western Electric Building), 1961
Calyon Building (formerly the Crédit Lyonnais Building and J. C. Penney Building), 1964
Uniroyal Giant Tire, Allen Park, Michigan, 1964
245 Park Avenue (formerly the Bear Stearns Building, American Brands Building, and American Tobacco Company Building), 1967
1250 Broadway (formerly the Cooper-Bregstein Building), 1967–1968
Stonehenge, North Bergen, New Jersey, 1968
475 Park Avenue South, 1969
Gouverneur Hospital, 1970
Textron Tower (formerly the 40 Westminster Building and Old Stone Tower), Providence, Rhode Island, 1972
55 Church Street, New Haven, Connecticut, 1974
Deutsche Bank Building (formerly the Bankers Trust Plaza, now demolished), 1974
3 Park Avenue, 1975

References
Notes

External links

Defunct architecture firms based in New York City
Skyscraper architects
Design companies established in 1920
1920 establishments in New York City